The 2015–16 A-League was the 39th season of top-flight soccer in Australia, and the 11th since the establishment of the A-League in 2004. Melbourne Victory were both the defending A-League Premiers and Champions. The regular season schedule was released on 29 June 2015. The season commenced on 8 October 2015 and concluded on 10 April 2016. The finals series commenced on 15 April 2016 and concluded with the 2016 Grand Final, held on 1 May 2016.

The 2016 Grand Final took place on 1 May 2016, with Adelaide United claiming their first Championship with a 3–1 win against Western Sydney Wanderers.

Clubs

Personnel and kits

 Additionally, referee kits are made by Umbro.

Transfers

Managerial changes

Foreign players
 
The following do not fill a Visa position:
1Those players who were born and started their professional career abroad but have since gained Australian citizenship (and New Zealand citizenship, in the case of Wellington Phoenix);
2Australian citizens (and New Zealand citizens, in the case of Wellington Phoenix) who have chosen to represent another national team;
3Injury Replacement Players, or National Team Replacement Players;
4Guest Players (eligible to play a maximum of fourteen games)

Salary cap exemptions and captains

The following concessions to the salary cap were introduced for this season:
 A Loyalty allowance on a sliding scale for players who have played 5 years at the same club. Maximum $200,000 for 10 years.
 A Mature Aged Rookie over the age of 21 who has not played in a fully professional league for the last 18 months and last played football in Australia.
 Each Club can pay three players who started their careers with the club outside the Salary Cap. This season the total has been lifted from $150,000 to $200,000. 
 The two Marquee Players (which sit outside the Salary Cap) can be two foreigners.
 Salary Cap Banking will allow clubs to carry over money not spent inside the Salary Cap in the previous two seasons to the following season, up to 105% of the Salary Cap in the relevant contract year.

Regular season

League table

Results

Finals series
The Grand Final winner (Champion) qualified for the 2017 AFC Champions League group stage

Elimination-finals

Semi-finals

Grand Final

Statistics

Attendances

By club
These are the attendance records of each of the teams at the end of the home and away season. The table does not include finals series attendances.

By round

Source:

Club membership

Player stats

Top scorers

Hat-tricks

Note
4 Player scored 4 goals

Own goals

Clean sheets

Discipline
During the season each club is given fair play points based on the number of cards they received in games. A yellow card is worth 1 point, a second yellow card is worth 2 points, and a red card is worth 3 points. At the annual awards night, the club with the fewest points wins the Fair Play Award.

End-of-season awards
The following end of the season awards were announced at the 2015–16 Dolan Warren Awards night held at the Carriageworks in Sydney on 26 April 2016.
 Johnny Warren Medal – Diego Castro, Perth Glory
 NAB Young Footballer of the Year – Jamie Maclaren, Brisbane Roar
 Nike Golden Boot Award – Bruno Fornaroli, Melbourne City (23 goals)
 Goalkeeper of the Year – Thomas Sørensen, Melbourne City
 Coach of the Year – Guillermo Amor, Adelaide United
 Fair Play Award – Brisbane Roar
 Referee of the Year – Jarred Gillett
 Goal of the Year – Roy O'Donovan, Central Coast Mariners (Adelaide United v Central Coast Mariners, 27 March 2016)

See also

 2015–16 Adelaide United FC season
 2015–16 Brisbane Roar FC season
 2015–16 Central Coast Mariners FC season
 2015–16 Melbourne City FC season
 2015–16 Melbourne Victory FC season
 2015–16 Newcastle Jets FC season
 2015–16 Perth Glory FC season
 2015–16 Sydney FC season
 2015–16 Wellington Phoenix FC season
 2015–16 Western Sydney Wanderers FC season

References

 
A-League Men seasons
A League
A League
A League